Roque Ceruti (Milan c. 1683 or 1686 – Lima 1760) was an Italian composer in Peru. He was recruited as conductor of the Viceroy of Peru's private orchestra, and was a dominant italianizing influence during the period, though this was resented by some of the more traditional Spanish musicians.

He served as maestro de capilla (chapel or choir master) of Trujillo Cathedral from 1721 to 1728, and then maestro at Lima Cathedral until his death. A fair amount of his works survives at the Archivo Arzobispal (Episcopal Archive) of Lima, at the collection that once belonged to the Cathedral of La Plata (i.e. modern Sucre, Bolivia) which is now housed at the Archivo y Biblioteca Nacionales de Bolivia, and at the Seminary of San Antonio Abad in Cusco and at La Paz.

Recordings
 1998 Roque Ceruti: Vêpres solennelles de Saint Jean Baptiste Ensemble Elyma K617 089
 2011 Roque Ceruti: "En la rama frondosa", transcripción Susana Sarfson, dirección Rodrigo Madrid Gómez, Capella Saetabis CD "Barroco boliviano", PSCU 540, Valencia (España).

References

Italian Baroque composers
Italian male classical composers
Peruvian Baroque composers
Italian male composers
Musicians from Milan
1680s births
1760 deaths
18th-century Italian composers
18th-century Italian male musicians